Lawrence M. Baskir (born January 10, 1938) is a senior judge of the United States Court of Federal Claims serving since 1997. He was chief judge from 2000 to 2002 and a judge on the court from 1998 to 2013 before assuming senior status in 2013.

Early life, education, and  career 
Lawrence M. Baskir was born in Brooklyn, New York, receiving a  Bachelor of Arts, magna cum laude, from the Woodrow Wilson School of Public and International Affairs at Princeton University in 1959 followed by an Bachelor of Laws from Harvard Law School in 1962. He was a United States Army Reserve first lieutenant in the JAG Corps from 1963–1968. Baskir than joined the United States Senate Committee on the Judiciary in 1965 and served till 1967 and then resumed service from 1969–1974 while becoming chief counsel and staff director from 1969–1974. He then was chief executive officer of the Presidential Clemency Board for The White House from 1974–1975. Baskir joined the Vietnam Project as a research professor and director at the University of Notre Dame Law School from 1975–1977. He was the Principal Deputy General Counsel for the United States Army from 1994–1998.

Federal judicial service
On January 7, 1997, Baskir was nominated by U.S. President Bill Clinton to a seat on the United States Court of Federal Claims vacated by Reginald W. Gibson. Baskir was confirmed by the United States Senate on October 21, 1998, and received his commission on October 22, 1998. He served as chief judge from 2000 to 2002, and assumed senior status on April 2, 2013.

Personal life 
Baskir is married to Marna Tucker and has two children.

References

External links

|-

Judges of the United States Court of Federal Claims
Lawyers from Brooklyn
United States Article I federal judges appointed by Bill Clinton
Princeton School of Public and International Affairs alumni
Harvard Law School alumni
Living people
1938 births
Military personnel from New York (state)